Edinburgh Synagogue was opened in 1932 and is located on Salisbury Road in the Newington area of Edinburgh. It is the home of the Edinburgh Hebrew Congregation (EHC) which was founded in 1816. Prior to the opening of the 1932 building, the congregation worshipped at  a converted chapel on Graham Street which had served as its synagogue since 1898.

The Edinburgh Hebrew Congregation is a mainstream Orthodox congregation under the auspices of the Chief Rabbi. The current rabbi is Rabbi David Rose who was appointed to the position in 2003.

Synagogues in Edinburgh 

The Edinburgh Hebrew Congregation, the city's first synagogue, was established in 1817 at Richmond Court for a congregation of 20 families. In 1868, the congregation had grown and so they moved the shul to a larger accommodation at Park Place. They moved again in 1898 to Graham Street.

Between 1881 and 1914, immigrants arrived in large numbers to Edinburgh. They brought different religious traditions with them. As a result, other congregations began to form. Some of these Jews migrated from within Britain. In 1879, Hasidic Jews from Manchester who had come to work in the Caledonian Rubber Works on Fountainbridge established a synagogue in the Dalry area on Caledonian Crescent. This synagogue served about 35 families. However, a majority of the migrant population came from the Pale of Settlement in Eastern Europe. In 1890, the Eastern European migrants established Edinburgh New Hebrew Congregation in Richmond Court. It was eventually moved to Roxburgh Place in 1916.

Creation of the Building 
In 1918, the Edinburgh Hebrew Congregation and the Edinburgh New Hebrew Congregation unified on paper but continued to worship in separate places given their different practices. Rabbi Dr. Salis Daiches, who arrived the next year, worked to make these communities into a more unified whole.

One method he used was building the Salisbury Road Synagogue so that the entire community could worship together. Soon after the Roxburgh Place Synagogue closed in 1927, Daiches began a fundraising campaign to build the new shul. Construction cost £20,000. This was a hard campaign given the small community, its waning interest in religious matters, and the difficult economic situation due to the Great Depression. In the end, they had to borrow £6,000 to complete the project.

Building began on 3 May 1931 when Walter Samuel, 2nd Viscount Bearsted laid the foundation stone. The synagogue took 15 months to complete and was opened  on 11 September 1932 by Chief Rabbi Joseph Hertz.  It was designed by Glasgow architect James Miller who was asked to make a prestigious building that would contribute to Edinburgh's architecture and provide a focal point for local Jewish life. The purpose-built synagogue could house 1,000 people and also had a mikveh on the premises.

From the beginning, the synagogue was too large for the amount of congregants attending. In 1981, Michael Henderson of Dick, Peddie & McKay was hired to reduce the interior. While the mikveh was in disuse by this point, it was retained. Then in 2003, it came back into use when the synagogue was renovated again with the help of a £300,000 grant from the Heritage Lottery Fund.

The synagogue was listed in 1996 as a grade B listed building.

See also
History of the Jews in Scotland
Scottish Council of Jewish Communities

References

External links
Official website
Edinburgh Jewish history
Edinburgh Synagogue: Jewish Small Communities Network

1932 establishments in Scotland
Orthodox synagogues in the United Kingdom
Religious buildings and structures in Edinburgh
Synagogues in Scotland